Mariscal Cáceres District (Spanish mariscal marshal) is one of nineteen districts of the province Huancavelica in Peru.

The district was named after the Peruvian president Andrés Avelino Cáceres.

References